Hymettus, also Hymettos (pronounced ), is a mountain range in the Athens area of Attica, East Central Greece. It is also colloquially known as Trellós (crazy) or Trellóvouno (crazy mountain); the latter originates from the French "très long" (very long) in awe of its winding length of 16 km, as used by French travelers during the occupation of Greece by the Ottomans. Hymettus was assigned the status of a protected area in the EU's Natura 2000 ecological network.

Geography

In ancient times, the highest point was known as Megas Hymettos and the southern peaks as Elattona (Ελάττονα) and Anydros Hymettos (Ἄνυδρος Ὑμηττός, "waterless Hymettos"). Today the southern peaks are called Mavrovouni (Μαυροβούνι, "black mountain") and Kontra (Κόντρα). It was noted for its thyme honey. Marble has been quarried since antiquity. The neighboring communities that surround the mountain are Athens (municipality), Zografou, Kaisariani, Vyronas, Ilissia (a region of Zografou), Ymittos, Ilioupoli, Argyroupoli, Elliniko, Glyfada, Voula and Vouliagmeni in the west, Varkiza, Vari, Markopoulo and Paiania to its east, and Papagou, Cholargos, Agia Paraskevi, Gerakas and Glyka Nera. Most of the forest is in the north, and much of the mountain is rocky, deforested, grassy and made out of limestone.

The flanks of Hymettos are dotted with caves. The smaller Liontari cave has its mouth at the north end of the mountain, west of Glyka Nera and is named after the lion of Hymettos which is said to have lived on the mountain in the past and to have terrified the inhabitants of the surrounding area.

Monuments
In antiquity there was a sanctuary to Zeus Ombrios ("Zeus rain bringer") on the summit with numerous offerings dating especially to the 8th-7th centuries BC; they are on the site of a military base and not currently accessible.  There is also an ancient quarryman's hut on the western slopes of the mountain, one of two buildings in ancient Attica which preserves its roof.

There are several notable Byzantine monasteries on the mountain, including:
 Kaisariani Monastery, founded in the 2nd century AD and built into the flank of the mountain, incorporating the ruins of an ancient church. The monastery reached its peak in the 12th and 13th centuries, when it was a political and spiritual centre.
 Monastery of St. John the Theologian, located between Cholargos and Papagou.
 , established on the northern peak of Hymettos in the 12th century.
 , located on the northwestern flank of Hymettos, to the west of Kaisariani.

Urban uses
Major campuses of the University of Athens and the National Technical University of Athens (collectively called "University Town") are located on the west-facing slope, between the Motorway 64, a ring road connected with the Motorway 6, and the urban sprawl of Athens. A transmitter park for several major TV and radio stations, along with military radar is located at the top of the mountain. Built up urban areas almost surround the entire mountain range. Access to the top of the mountain is restricted to authorized vehicles for maintenance of the towers.

Almost all of Athens, its eastern suburbs and the new airport can be seen from the mountain top along with the mountains of Parnitha to its northwest, Penteli to its north and Aigaleo to its west. The valley areas that create the lowest passes are to the south and one further south.

Alteration of the mountain
The mountain range features about six to seven landfills in the western part and another in the eastern part.

References

External links

Automatic acoustic Monitoring and Inventorying of BIOdiversity

Landforms of Attica
Mountain ranges of Greece
Landforms of Central Athens (regional unit)
Landforms of South Athens (regional unit)
Landforms of East Attica
Landforms of North Athens (regional unit)
Natura 2000 in Greece
Mountains associated with Christian monasticism